CNN Philippines The Source with Pinky Webb (or simply "The Source") is a current affairs and talk show program of CNN Philippines. It premiered on September 26, 2016, and airs on weekdays at 9:00 a.m. PST. Anchored by CNN Philippines' Senior Anchor and Correspondent, Pinky Webb, who is also an anchor of the network's flagship Filipino language noontime newscast, CNN Philippines Balitaan (a companion show of The Source).

Background 
The program's tagline is "Where we combined the headlines with in-depth conversations with the newsmakers themselves" and "Going straight to the source of the story."

The Source focuses on in-depth, one-on-one interview with different personalities in different arenas, such as politics, government, even entertainment, lifestyle and trending and most-talked personalities in social media.

CNN Philippines' Executive Vice President and managing Editor Armie Jarin-Bennett explains that "The program gives us an opportunity to delve deeper into the issues that are most important to our viewers. It’s also an opportunity to go beyond the headlines, as well as listen and engage with our viewers through social media.” 

The Source, also debut a segment called "In Focus", wherein features a light-hearted stories that serves as a balance to the program.

The Source or One-on-One with Pinky Webb won as "Best Current Affairs Programme or Series" in the Asian Academy Creative Awards for National Category on October 15, 2020.

Host  
 Pinky Webb

Substitute Anchors
 Ria Tanjuatco-Trillo 
 Ruth Cabal
 Mai Rodriguez

Former Substitute Anchors
 Amelyn Veloso†
 Cherie Mercado

See also
 List of programs broadcast by CNN Philippines

References

CNN Philippines
CNN Philippines original programming
CNN Philippines News and Current Affairs
Philippine television news shows
2016 Philippine television series debuts